Rudy Verdonck (born 7 August 1965) is a Belgian former professional racing cyclist. He rode in three editions of the Tour de France.

References

External links
 

1965 births
Living people
Belgian male cyclists
Sportspeople from Turnhout
Cyclists from Antwerp Province